Men and Beasts is a 1962 Soviet-German drama film directed by Sergei Gerasimov.

Plot 
The film tells about a man named Alexei, who returns home after wandering and as a result of misunderstanding by his family he went to Zaporozhye.

Cast 
 Nikolai Yeremenko Sr. as Alexei Ivanovic Pavlov (as Nikolaj Eremenko)
 Tamara Makarova as Anna Andreevna
 Zhanna Bolotova as Tanja
 Tatyana Gavrilova
 Karla Assmus as Annemarie
 Fredy Barten as Koch
 Evelyn Cron as Brigitte
 Vitali Doronin
 Erika Dunkelmann as Frau Haslinger
 Jürgen Frohriep as Gefreiter

References

External links 
 

1962 drama films
1962 films
Films scored by Aram Khachaturian
1960s Russian-language films
Soviet drama films